Charles Allen Wheeler (January 23, 1861—October 20, 1932) was an American lawyer and legislator who served in the Texas Senate for district 3.

Background
Wheeler was born on January 23, 1861, in Barren County, Kentucky. He was a lawyer and member of the Odd fellows. He married on November 7, 1892.

A Democrat, Wheeler represented district 3 in the Texas Senate during the 27th legislature. At the time, the district was composed of Fannin County and Bonham County.

References

1861 births
1932 deaths
Texas state senators